Tena may refer to:
 Tena, Cundinamarca, a municipality and town in Cundinamarca, Colombia
 Tena, Ecuador, capital of Ecuador's Napo Province
 Tena (woreda), a district in the Oromia Region of Ethiopia
 Tena Campbell, American judge
 Tena Japundža, Croatian handball player
 Tena Katsaounis, Greek-American statistician
 Tena Lukas, Croatian tennis player
 Tena Negere, an Ethiopian long-distance runner
 Tena Štivičić, Croatian playwright and screenwriter
 Tanis Diena, an ancient Latvian sacred holiday
 Tena Valley, a valley located at the southern side of the Pyrenees
 Natalia Tena, an English actress and musician
 Betaf language, a Papuan language

See also 

 TENA (disambiguation)

Croatian feminine given names